This table includes buildings in the Gaslamp Quarter Historic District in San Diego, California. The order of entries in the table is taken from a brochure printed by the Gaslamp Quarter Historical Foundation titled Architectural Guide and Walking Tour Map. This order also corresponds to numbers listed at the top of historic building survey plaques on many Gaslamp Quarter buildings.

Buildings

See also

 List of San Diego Historic Landmarks
 National Register of Historic Places in San Diego County

Further reading
 Bugbee and Flanigan, San Diego's Historic Gaslamp Quarter: Then and Now, Tecolote, 2003
 Gaslamp Quarter Association, Gaslamp Quarter Historical Foundation, San Diego Historical Society, Images of America: San Diego's Gaslamp Quarter, Arcadia, 2003

References

External links
 Gaslamp Quarter Historical Foundation
 San Diego History Center

Buildings and structures in San Diego

 01
Gaslamp Quarter
Gaslamp Quarter
Gaslamp Quarter
Gaslamp Quarter, San Diego